TVI - initialism for Televisão Independente ("Independent Television") - is Portugal's fourth terrestrial television channel, launched in 1993. It was the most watched channel in Portugal from 2005 to 2019. It competes directly with SIC and RTP1. It is one of the two private free-to-air channels in Portugal, among the seven terrestrial free-to-air channels broadcasting from the country.

History
TVI was the second private Portuguese TV channel to be launched, SIC having been launched five months before, and the fourth channel in all. Already under the name TVI, but marketed as 4, in which the '4' was the sole element in its logo, TVI was initially owned by some prominent Catholic Church institutions, including Rádio Renascença, RFM, Universidade Católica Portuguesa, Público, Editorial Verbo and União das Misericórdias; Antena 3 Televisión (which consisted of La Vanguardia, ABC-Prensa Española, Manuel Martín Ferrand (4,3%), Rafael and Manuel Jiménez de Parga, Europa Press and Grupo Zeta), the Luxembourgish Compagnie Luxembourgeoise de Télédiffusion, (CLT, now RTL Group), Sonae, the Scandinavian SBS Broadcasting Group and ITV contractor Yorkshire Television were minor stakeholders of TVI. This majority-Catholic ownership pushed TVI's programming in the direction of Christian values. In the first years of its existence, TVI assumed the role of an 'alternative' television broadcaster, dedicating segments of its airtime to distinct target audiences, with part of the morning dedicated to housewives and the elderly and part of the afternoon to the young. Broadcasts were initially experimental, before upgrading to regular status in October the same year.

During this period, TVI was known for its American series and movies, including X-Files and Baywatch, and most notably the Spanish show El gran juego de la oca (translated as O Jogo do Ganso) imported from Antena 3. TVI also brought in some prominent names in Portuguese television, including Manuel Luís Goucha and Artur Albarran, but the viewing figures had were always lower than expected – higher than RTP2 but lower than the top 2 channels then, SIC and RTP1 – and it entered into deep financial crisis.

TVI's recovery happened when it was totally acquired by Media Capital between 1997 and 1999, one of the most important media conglomerates in Portugal, whereupon it started broadcasting more Portuguese-produced programs, including soap operas. This helped to increase its audience significantly, but it was in September 2000, when Big Brother started, that the channel gained a boost in popularity. The once 3rd-ranked (by 2000) TVI went on to surpass RTP1 for second place in 2001 and four years later, defeated SIC to take first place, which it maintained for 14 consecutive years before losing it once more to SIC in 2019.

Currently, TVI is known for having a large number of national reality shows and soap operas. It broadcasts a mix of local productions, such as soap operas, family series and reality shows, news programs and international movies and series (mostly American). It is currently owned by Media Capital, which is owned by Grupo Prisa. Until February 2007, Media Capital was co-owned by RTL Group and Grupo Prisa. The station works with Media Capital-owned production company Plural Entertainment to produce its national fictional content.

Like public service broadcaster RTP and unlike commercial rival SIC, which have always shown foreign programs in the original language with subtitles, TVI tried, unsuccessfully, to dub foreign programs into Portuguese after achieving marginal success with Latin American Spanish-language soap operas dubbed in Brazilian Portuguese. Experiments of dubbing included the US series Dawson's Creek and other shows directed at younger audiences.

Criticism 
In July 2010, TVI censored a kiss between two male characters on the youth TV series Morangos com Açúcar, due to pressure by a fundamentalist far-right organization, "National Resistance". This cut has led to a major outcry, and has been widely perceived as an occurrence of homophobia. At least 10 civil society organizations called for the reinstatement of the cut scene.
As of 2015, TVI no longer censors homosexual scenes and has become an important symbol of it in Portugal.

TVI had still broadcast in 4:3 as of 2015, even though, on its early days, it received European funds to promote and broadcast in 16:9 PAL-plus. However, the network's board of directors announced in September 2015 that its channels will move to the widescreen format, starting with the premiere of Santa Bárbara on 28 September and finalizing the move on 3 October, one day before the general elections.

Some viewers criticized the channel as it broadcasts US television series after midnight. TVI's prime time is reserved for in-house programming, mainly soap operas, viewer-participation quizzes and reality shows, in a similar manner to its direct competitor SIC.

Programs

Regular
All times are WET.

National

Soap operas currently airing
 Festa é Festa – Party is party  
 Para sempre – Forever'
 Quero é Viver – I Want to LiveRecently previous soap operas
 Ouro Verde – " Green Gold " – (Telenovela) 2017–2017
 A Impostora – " The Impostor " – (Telenovela) 2016–2017
 Santa Bárbara – Saint Barbara (Telenovela) 2015–2016
 A Única Mulher – The Only Woman (Telenovela) 2015–2017

TV Series
 Massa Fresca – Fresh PastaNews

 Diário da Manhã – Morning Diary Jornal da Uma – News at One Jornal das 8 – News at EightTalent shows
 A Tua Cara Não Me É Estranha 4 – Your Face Sounds Familiar 4Reality shows
 Secret Story: Desafio Final 4

 Big Brother

Talk shows
 Goucha – Goucha Dois às 10– two at ten Somos Portugal – We're PortugalInternational

Series currently airing
 Hawaii Five-0
 Chicago Fire

Movies
Movies from the following studios/distributors:
 Paramount Pictures/DreamWorks Pictures (rights co-shared with SIC)
 20th Century Fox/Regency Enterprises (rights co-shared with RTP and SIC)
 Universal Studios/Focus Features (rights co-shared with RTP and SIC)
 DreamWorks Animation

Sports
 UEFA Champions League
 UEFA Super Cup

Other
 Sunday Eucharist and 8° Dia (8th Day) – Sunday Christian Catholic mass and religious show broadcast on Sundays, before the lunchtime news block.
 Cartaz das Artes (Arts' Poster) – weekly cultural agenda show, displayed in the first hours of Friday, hosted by João Paulo Sacadura.
 EuroMillions – the lottery draw that gives its name to the show, is broadcast on Tuesdays and Fridays after News at Eight''.

References

External links
 Official Site
TVI's first moments and the first news service
Media Capital
Rádio Renascença
Mega FM
Grupo PRISA
Genérico TVI

 
Homophobia
Television networks in Portugal
Television stations in Portugal
PRISA
Television channels and stations established in 1993
Portuguese-language television networks
1993 establishments in Portugal